Moritz Gerhard von Breuning (28 August 1813 – 6 May 1892) was an Austrian physician, known for his description of Ludwig van Beethoven's last years.

Life
Breuning was born in Vienna in 1813; his parents were Stephan von Breuning and his second wife Marie Constanze Ruschowitz.  Stephan von Breuning came to Vienna from Bonn about 1800; he was a member of the Austrian Hofkriegsrat, and in 1818 became Hofrat.

Gerhard von Breuning is known particularly for his friendship in his youth with Ludwig van Beethoven. Gerhard's father, Stephan Von Breuning and Beethoven had known each other since when they were boys in Bonn. Beethoven had given piano lessons to Stephan's younger siblings and the young Beethoven became a close friend to the entire Breuning family. Beethoven and Stephan were also both violin pupils of Franz Anton Ries, and their friendship continued in Vienna. Gerhard lived during his childhood in the Rotherhaus, near Beethoven's last home, an apartment in the Schwarzspanierhaus; during the final nearly two years of Beethoven's life, Gerhard frequently visited the composer. Beethoven was quite fond of young Gerhard and enjoyed his visits. He liked to call him Ariel (referring to the character in Shakespeare's The Tempest), and, since Gerhard was known to be dependent upon his father, also called him "Hosenknopf" (trouser button).

Breuning later became an eminent physician in Vienna. He was also for many years an active committee member of the Gesellschaft der Musikfreunde.  In 1870 he published Aus dem Schwarzspanierhause: Erinnerungen an Ludwig van Beethoven aus meiner Jugendzeit, in which he described his memories of Beethoven; it is an important biographical source about the composer's last years. Gerhard Von Breuning died in Vienna in 1892 at the age of 78.

References

1813 births
1892 deaths
19th-century Austrian physicians
Physicians from Vienna